Mervin James Connors (January 23, 1914 – January 8, 2006) was a professional baseball player who played 52 games as an infielder in the Major Leagues from 1937 to 1938 for the Chicago White Sox.

Hit three home runs in successive at-bats and just missed a fourth in one game in 1938. 

He accumulated 400 home runs with 1,629 RBI during his career in the minor leagues.

He died at age 91 on January 8, 2006, and was interred in Chapel of the Chimes Columbarium and Mausoleum, Oakland, California.

See also
Chicago White Sox all-time roster

External links

1914 births
2006 deaths
Major League Baseball infielders
Baseball players from California
Chicago White Sox players
Carlsbad Potashers players